Tiab Rural District is a rural district (dehestan) in the Central District of Minab County, Hormozgan Province, Iran. At the 2006 census, its population was 17,835, in 3,527 families. The rural district has 17 villages.

References 

Rural Districts of Hormozgan Province
Minab County